Ishaath Public School, Poonoor is an English-medium school in Poonoor, India. It was run by Markaz Garden of Markazu Ssaqafathi Ssunniyya by affiliation of Central Board of Secondary Education, New Delhi and Ideal Association for Minority Education.

See also
Sheikh Abubakr Ahmad
 Knowledge City
 Markaz Arts and Science College
 Markaz Law College
 Shahre Mubarak Grand Masjid
Markazu Saquafathi Sunniyya
Markaz, Dubai

References

External links
 

Markaz
Central Board of Secondary Education
Boarding schools in Kerala
Schools in Kozhikode district
Educational institutions established in 1993
1993 establishments in Kerala
Thamarassery area